V Live may refer to:

 V Live (album), by Vitalic (2007)
 V Live (website)
 V-live, another term for virtual concert

See also
 V (Live album), 2001